The 2000 WPA World Nine-ball Championship was the 11th edition of the WPA World Championship for 9-Ball Pool. It took place from July 1 to 7, 2000 in Cardiff, Wales.

Chao Fong-pang won the event, defeating Mexican Ismael Páez in the final, winning 17–6.

Efren Reyes and Nick Varner were the two defending champions going into the event, but both lost in the 1st Round.

Format
The 96 participating players were divided into 16 groups, in which they competed in round robin mode against each other. The top four players in each group qualified for the final round played in the knockout system.

Prize money
The event's prize money stayed similar to that of the previous years, with winner Mika Immonen winning $65,000.

Preliminary round 

The following 16 players finished fifth in their group.

The following 16 players finished sixth in their group.

Final round

References

External links
Empire Poker WPA World Pool Championship 2000 at azbilliards.com

2000
WPA World Nine-ball Championship
WPA World Nine-ball Championship
International sports competitions hosted by Wales